Middle Creek Township (also designated Township 12) is one of twenty townships within Wake County, North Carolina, United States. As of the 2010 census, Middle Creek Township had a population of 44,136, a 75.5% increase over 2000.

Middle Creek Township, occupying  in southern Wake County, includes most of the town of Fuquay-Varina and portions of the town of Holly Springs.

Watersheds
Neills Creek, a tributary to the Cape Fear River, rises in the southern end of this township.

References

Townships in Wake County, North Carolina
Townships in North Carolina